Slea Head (Irish: Ceann Sléibhe) is a promontory in the westernmost part of the Dingle Peninsula, located in the barony of Corca Dhuibhne in southwest County Kerry, Ireland. It belongs to the province of Munster and the county of Kerry and is served by the R559 road; the nearest villages are Ballyickeen and Coumeenoole. The headland itself, together with the larger part of Mount Eagle's southern slopes is formed from steeply dipping beds of the pebbly sandstones and conglomerates of the Slea Head Formation, dating from the Devonian period and traditionally referred to as the Old Red Sandstone.

Just to the northwest of Ceann Sléibhe is Dunmore Head, the westernmost point of Ireland. Ceann Sléibhe is a well known and recognised landmark and also a very scenic viewpoint, with a dramatic view of the Blasket Islands.  On 11 March 1982, the Spanish container ship, Ranga, was wrecked at Dunmore Head, close to Ceann Sléibhe after losing power in a storm.

The Slea Head Drive 
The Slea Head Drive is one of the Dingle Peninsula's most stunning routes. En route are several famous landmarks such as Ventry Beach, Pre-historic Fort and Beehive Huts, The Dingle Famine Cottage, views of the Blaskets Islands and Coumenole Beach and Gallarus Oratory. The loop road returns towards Dingle (the capital of the Kerry Gaeltacht Irish-speaking area)

References

Headlands of County Kerry
Gaeltacht places in County Kerry